Getaway is Australia's longest-running travel and lifestyle television program. Debuting on 14 May 1992, it is broadcast on the Nine Network and TLC. Its main competitor was The Great Outdoors on the Seven Network until 2009. It is hosted by Catriona Rowntree with various project contributors. The first season looked at only tourism locally, including resorts and locations, but by 1993 had expanded to look at international travel and tourism destinations.

Presenters
 Catriona Rowntree (1996–present)
 David Reyne (1992–1993, 1996–present)
 Charli Robinson (2003–present)
 Jason Dundas (2006–present)
 Tim Blackwell (2015–present)
 Livinia Nixon (2012–present)

Guest Presenters
 Amber Lawrence
 Lauren Phillips
 Samantha McClymont
 Anna Gare
 Ian 'Dicko' Dickson
 Jesinta Franklin
 Ray Martin
 David Genat
 Renee Bargh
 Sussan Mourad

Former Presenters
 Kelly Landry (2008–2011)
 Natalie Gruzlewski (2004–2014)
 Sophie Monk (2010–2011)
 Kate Ceberano (2011-2019)
 Jennifer Hawkins (2011-2019)
 Dermott Brereton (2007–2011)
 Giaan Rooney (2008–2012)
 Jules Lund (2004–2012)
 Henry Azaris (2003-2007)
 Ben Dark (1999–2010)
 Erik Thomson (2006–2007)
 Jodhi Meares (2006)
 Megan Gale (2005–2006)
 Brendon Julian (2004–2005)
 Sorrel Wilby (1996–2005)
 Lochie Daddo (1994–1999)
 Jeff Watson (1992–1998)
 Rebecca Harris (1992–1997)
 Chrissy Morrisey (1995)
 Jane Rutter (1994)
 Tina Dalton (1992–1993)
 Anna McMahon (1992–1993)

Awards
Getaway won a People's Choice Award in 1994 and an Australian Tourism Award for Excellence in the Media in 1995.

Getaway has also been nominated for the Most Popular Lifestyle Program Logie Award at the Logie Awards of 2003, 2004 and 2005, each time being beaten by Backyard Blitz. It was also nominated at the Logie Awards of 1999 and nominated as the Favourite Lifestyle Program at the Australian People Choice Awards of 1999.

"Seven Wonders of the World"

In an episode broadcast in 2007, Getaway viewers were asked to choose a new Seven Wonders of the World based on several destinations which had been pre-selected by the show's producers.

The destinations were (winners are shown in bold):

Natural wonders:

 Milford Sound
 Mount Everest
Grand Canyon

Ancient: one wonder

 Machu Picchu
Pyramids of Giza
 Petra

Ancient: two wonders
 Angkor Wat
Great Wall of China
 Easter Island

Waterfall wonders
Niagara Falls
 Victoria Falls
 Iguazu Falls

Modern wonders
Eiffel Tower
 Taj Mahal
 Sydney Opera House

City wonders
Rome
 New York City
 Shanghai

Island wonders
 Bora Bora
 Aitutaki
Santorini

New Zealand version 
A New Zealand version of the program, with some local content, was broadcast on TV One and Prime TV.

Former Presenters
 Suzy Clarkson
 Charlotte Dawson
 Clarke Gayford
 Lance Hipkins
 Renee Wright

See also

 List of longest-running Australian television series
 List of Australian television series
 List of Nine Network programs

References

External links
Official Getaway website

Getaway at the National Film and Sound Archive

Nine Network original programming
Australian non-fiction television series
Australian travel television series
1992 Australian television series debuts
2000s Australian television series
2010s Australian television series
English-language television shows
Travelogues